WOW Essentials 2 is a collection of some recent favorite Christian songs on the contemporary Christian music scene. It showcases twelve songs on a single CD. The album reached No. 24 on the Billboard Christian Albums chart during 2009.

Track listing

See also
 WOW Series

References 

WOW series albums
2009 compilation albums